The rusty-breasted whistler (Pachycephala fulvotincta), also known as the fulvous-tinted whistler, is a species of bird in the family Pachycephalidae. It is endemic to Indonesia, where it ranges from Java east to Alor and north to the Selayar Islands.

Taxonomy and systematics
The rusty-breasted whistler is variably considered as either a subspecies of the widespread Australian golden whistler or treated as a separate species, but strong published evidence in favour of either treatment is limited, and further study is warranted to resolve the complex taxonomic situation. The name 'rusty-breasted whistler' is also used as an alternate name for the rusty whistler.

Subspecies 
Five subspecies are recognized:
 P. f. teysmanni – Büttikofer, 1893: Originally described as a separate species. Found on Selayar Islands (south of Sulawesi)
 P. f. everetti – Hartert, 1896: Originally described as a separate species. Found on Tanahjampea, Kalaotoa and Madu Islands (south of Sulawesi)
 P. f. javana – Hartert, 1928: Found on eastern Java and Bali
 P. f. fulvotincta – Wallace, 1864: Found on western Lesser Sundas
 P. f. fulviventris – Hartert, 1896: Originally described as a separate species. Found on Sumba Island (south-central Lesser Sundas)

Description 
Compared to other members of the golden whistler group, the rusty-breasted whistler is relatively small, and males have a white throat and a rust-tinged chest, except in the subspecies teysmanni from Selayar Islands where the plumage of the male is female-like.

Distribution and habitat
It is the westernmost member of the golden whistler group, being bordered to the east by the black-chinned and yellow-throated whistlers, and to the south by the Australian golden whistler.

References

rusty-breasted whistler
Birds of the Lesser Sunda Islands
rusty-breasted whistler